Kevin Joseph Landolt (born October 25, 1975) is an American football defensive tackle in the National Football League. Landolt was drafted by the Jacksonville Jaguars in the 1999 NFL Draft with the 121st pick overall. Landolt attended and played football at the West Virginia University. Landolt is married with 3 kids & currently resides in New Jersey.

Landolt played high school football at Holy Cross Academy, as did his brother Dennis, who also played in the NFL.

Professional career
Kevin Landolt played in only five games for the Jacksonville Jaguars. He was only able to record 2 sacks of statistic, and spent time on the bench. His most notable sack was against Donovan McNabb of the Philadelphia Eagles. Later on, the Jaguars would release him, causing him to become a free agent. Landolt also had a brief stint in the XFL after being drafted by the Birmingham Thunderbolts in the 2001 XFL Draft.

References

1975 births
Living people
Holy Cross Academy (New Jersey) alumni

People from Mount Holly, New Jersey
Players of American football from New Jersey
Sportspeople from Burlington County, New Jersey
Jacksonville Jaguars players
Birmingham Thunderbolts players